Madaram is a census town in Mancherial district in the Indian state of Telangana.

Demographics
 India census, Madaram had a population of 6691. Males constitute 51% of the population and females 49%. Madaram has an average literacy rate of 63%, higher than the national average of 59.5%: male literacy is 72%, and female literacy is 54%. In Madaram, 9% of the population is under 6 years of age.

References

Villages in Adilabad district